The Stolpersteine in the Karlovarský kraj lists the Stolpersteine in the Karlovy Vary Region  (also "Carlsbad Region") in the westernmost part of Bohemia. Stolpersteine is the German name for stumbling blocks collocated all over Europe by German artist Gunter Demnig. They remember the fate of the Nazi victims being murdered, deported, exiled or driven to suicide.

Generally, the stumbling blocks are posed in front of the building where the victims had their last self chosen residence. The name of the Stolpersteine in Czech is: Kameny zmizelých, stones of the disappeared.

The lists are sortable; the basic order follows the alphabet according to the last name of the victim.

Chodov

Dates of collocations 
The Stolpersteine in the Karlovarský kraj were collocated by the artist himself on the following dates:
 2 August 2015: Staroměstská 18
 1 August 2016: Komenského 1077

See also 
 List of cities by country that have stolpersteine
 Stolpersteine in the Czech Republic

External links

 stolpersteine.eu, Demnig's website
 holocaust.cz Czech databank of Holocaust victims

References

Karlovarský kraj